Cornisepta antarctica is a species of sea snail, a marine gastropod mollusk in the family Fissurellidae, the keyhole limpets and slit limpets.

Description
The shell grows to a height of 8 mm.

Distribution
This species occurs in Antarctic waters of the Weddell Sea.

References

External links
 To Encyclopedia of Life
 To World Register of Marine Species
 

Fissurellidae
Gastropods described in 1972